Muhammad Hawadle Madar (1939–2005), also known as Hawadle Madar was the Prime Minister of Somalia from September 3, 1990, to January 24, 1991. A former member of the Somali Revolutionary Socialist Party, he was in office in the period leading up to the outbreak of the Somali Civil War. He was a member of the Sa'ad Musa sub-division of the Habr Awal Isaaq clan.

Biography
Madar was born in 1939 in the northwestern town of Hargeisa, then a part of British Somaliland. Madar studied in the Soviet Union, where he received a Bachelor of Science in engineering. Madar held several ministerial positions in the Somali Democratic Republic. Between 1975 and 1981, Madar served as Minister of Public works, followed as the Minister of Communication and Post from 1981 to 1983. He also served as a Minister of Planning (1984–1986). Madar headed the economy committee of the People's Assembly. Then, he was elected as deputy speaker of the People's Assembly. On 3 September 1990, Madar appointed as Prime Minister of Somalia, a position he held until 24 January 1991, eventually succeeded he was replaced by Umar Arteh Ghalib.

Death
Madar died in London, UK, in 2005, and was buried in Hargeisa.

Notes

1939 births
2005 deaths
20th-century prime ministers of Somalia
Somali Revolutionary Socialist Party politicians